Leonard Latkovski, Jr. (1943-2015) was a Latvian American professor of history and international studies at Hood College, who championed Eastern European studies, particularly those of his ethnic origin in Latgale, Latvia.

Background

Leonard Latkovski Jr., was born on June 9, 1943, in Kārsava, Latgale, Latvia. His Catholic parents were Leonard Latkovski, Sr., and Albīna Putāns. (Latkovski Sr. was a professor of Classics at Bellarmine College.) He had eight siblings. In 1944, his family fled from the advancing Soviet army from Latvia to Germany, where they lived in refugee camps until they emigrated to the United States in 1950 and settled in Louisville, Kentucky.  In 1961, Latkovski graduated from Louisville St. Xavier High School. In 1964, he received a BA in History from Bellarmine College (and served as president of its student body). At Georgetown University, he earned an MA in Russia and Eastern European history in 1967 and doctorate in Russian History in 1973.

Career

In 1969, Latkovski joined Hood College and taught History and Political Science there for more than 45 years–until his death in 2015. For some years, he was the Chair of the History and Political Science Department. He also coached the college's tennis team.

Latkovski led groups of students on trips to the Baltic countries and Russia. As a Catholic, he used these tours during the Soviet era to monitor religious persecution, to interview priests and citizens, and reported to the Vatican, including personally to Pope John Paul II. As an historian, "he placed a critical spotlight on deportations and inhuman conditions in Soviet gulags, having interviewed dozens of survivors."

Latkovski was a frequent commentator on current politics in US media, including National Public Radio, newspapers, and local television. He also appeared in Russian and Latvian media. Near the time of his death, he was working on a project entitled "The History of the Catholic Church in Latvia."

Personal life and death

In 1967, Latkovski married Patricia Hannigan; they had four children.

As a former refugee, Latkovski championed the disenfranchised including the poor, mentally ill, and oppressed. He tutored and often housed new immigrants and advocated for  civil rights. Soviet Gulag interviewees included the daughter of his own aunt after 14 years of imprisonment for religious and democracy efforts.

After discovering the spelling of his first name as Leonhards ("Lion Hearted"), he began to adopt use of that name over "Leonard". He died on June 13, 2015, in Frederick, Maryland.

Legacy

Latkovski was director of the Latgale Renaissance Fund and founded the Latgale Research Center and the Gulag Research Press.  He provided "trunk loads" of medicine and necessities on his trips to Latvia.

Known in his native Latgale for his teachings and dedication to the region, Latkovski was once honored with a biographical exhibit at the Central Rēzekne Library.

In October 2015, Hood College announced the Dr. Leonard Latkovski Memorial Prize in History, originally established in 2009 and renamed in 2015 for Latkovski's "outstanding achievement in history."

Works

 Dreaded Island: The History of Novaya Zemlya (1968) with Michael W. Adler
 Dictionary of Historic Documents (1990) (introduction)
Aglona: History of the Church and Monastery (2009). Latgalian Culture Centre, Rezekne.
Baltic Prisoners in the Gulag Revolts of 1953, part I. Lituanus, 51(3), p. 4-39.
Baltic Prisoners in the Gulag Revolts of 1953, part II. Lituanus,51(4), p. 5-30.

References

External sources

 lenlatkovski.com
 Latgale Research Center

1943 births
2015 deaths
20th-century American historians
American male non-fiction writers
Hood College faculty
Georgetown University alumni
Latvian emigrants to the United States
20th-century American male writers